Rudolf von Eschwege (1895–1917) was a German flying ace during World War I credited with 20 confirmed and six unconfirmed aerial victories as the only German fighter pilot on the entire Macedonian front, where he was opposed by over 160 enemy aircraft. Among his aerial combats were three highly hazardous successful attacks on observation balloons serving as artillery direction posts. The fourth one he attacked was loaded with explosives; when it was detonated from the ground, it blew him out of the sky.

The victory list

Confirmed victories in this list are numbered and listed chronologically, rather than in order of confirmation.
Abbreviations from sources utilized were expanded by editor creating this list.

Citations

Bibliography

Eschwege, Rudolf von
German military-related lists